Zygmunt Malanowicz (4 February 1938 – 4 April 2021) was a Polish film actor. He appeared in more than 30 films from 1962 to 2020.

Selected filmography
 Knife in the Water (1962)
 Naked Among Wolves (1963)
 Barrier (1966)
 Hunting Flies (1969)
 Landscape After the Battle (1970)
 Znaki na drodze (1970)
 Jarosław Dąbrowski (1976)
 Cserepek (1980)
 A Trap (1997)
 All That I Love (2009)
 The Lure (2015)
 Usta usta (2020)

References

External links
 
 

1938 births
2021 deaths
Polish male film actors
People from Švenčionys District Municipality
20th-century Polish male actors
21st-century Polish male actors